Thomas James Cashman (born 14 September 1989) is an Australian stand-up comedian and writer. He is best known for his appearances on The Project, his content on TikTok, and for his duty as co-host on the Australian version of Taskmaster.

Career

Television 
Cashman has appeared as a regular host on The Project, and has guested on The Hundred with Andy Lee, Question Everything, Celebrity Letters & Numbers, and Tonightly with Tom Ballard. Cashman was also on the writing team for Planet America, Tonightly with Tom Ballard., and ABC'''s Win the Week.

In February 2023, Taskmaster Australia began airing on Network 10, with Cashman in the role of the Taskmaster's assistant.

 Social Media 
During Sydney's second lockdown during the COVID-19 pandemic, Cashman began making videos on the popular social media app TikTok, with his 'landlord reference saga' gaining particular traction. In these videos, Cashman asked a prospective landlord for a reference written by a previous tenant, and shared their response. In addition to garnering millions of views, these videos inspired ACT politician Michael Pettersson to introduce a motion to the ACT Legislative Assembly which would allow renters to ask for references from prospective landlords.

 Radio and Podcasts 
In April 2020, Cashman began hosting The Good Stuff podcast, alongside fellow comic Sam Taunton.

In 2022, Cashman began presenting a regular segment on Triple J. Stand-up 

Cashman has taken his live shows to the Edinburgh Fringe Festival, the Melbourne International Comedy Festival, the Sydney Comedy Festival. He has toured Australia and the UK, and his "natural storytelling skills" and "overly polite and charismatic" personality have both been sources of acclaim.

In 2022, Cashman began the show "All Comedians Are Beautiful" (ACAB) with his The Good Stuff'' co-host Sam Taunton. This weekly performance in the Sydney suburb of Chippendale began as a trial run for the comics' individual shows, and then developed into the duo compéring for a variety of other comedians.

Full shows: 
 Good (2018)
 XYZ (2019)
 Graphs (2022)

External links

References 

Australian stand-up comedians
Living people
Australian television presenters
Australian podcasters
Australian TikTokers